"Easy on Me" is a song by English singer Adele from her fourth studio album 30 (2021). Adele wrote the song with its producer, Greg Kurstin. Columbia Records released it as the album's lead single on 15 October 2021. It is a minimally produced pop ballad set to a prominent, sombre piano and propelled by sparse bass beats. Expressing themes of nostalgia, regret, and forgiveness, the lyrics represent Adele's plea to her son, in which she details her struggles with her dissolved marriage and requests him to be kind to her.

The song received critical acclaim, with praise towards its poignant lyrics and vocals. In the United Kingdom and United States, the song marked Adele's third and fifth chart toppers, respectively. "Easy on Me" broke the Spotify and Amazon Music records for the most streams for a song in both a day and a week. It became the longest running number-one song on the US Billboard Hot 100 by a female artist in the 2020s decade, with ten weeks atop the chart. It topped the singles charts in 29 countries across the globe.

An accompanying music video, directed by Canadian filmmaker Xavier Dolan and shot in Sutton, Quebec, was released on 15 October 2021, continuing the setting established in the music video for Adele's 2015 song "Hello", where she is seen entering a furnished house. In the video, Adele vacates the house and drives off in a truck as a pile of sheet music flies out of it, littering the road. A duet rendition with Chris Stapleton was featured on Target and Japanese editions of 30 and was released to country radio in the US on 19 November 2021. The solo version won the Brit Award for Song of the Year at the Brit Awards 2022 and the Grammy Award for Best Pop Solo Performance at the 65th Grammy Awards.Anthony

Release and promotion
On 1 October 2021, multiple posters and projections stating "30" appeared on significant landmarks and buildings in different cities around the world. Instalments of the logo were largely linked to the title of Adele's upcoming studio album. On 4 October, the singer's social media accounts were updated for the first time in months. The following day, Adele teased the song and its music video through an instrumental clip she posted on her social media. The black-and-white teaser shows Adele putting a cassette tape into the tape deck of a truck and turning up the volume. She then drives off with the windows rolled down, while piles of sheet music fly out of the windows. Billboard writer Gil Kaufman thought the visuals were "Adele to the core". The teaser was widely compared to the music video of Adele's previous lead single, "Hello" (2015). The teaser clip of the song garnered over 17 million views, becoming the most viewed clip by a female artist on Twitter. 

During an interview with Vogue, it was revealed that long-time collaborator Greg Kurstin worked on the song. The staff at Capital FM interpreted the song title as documenting the "start of a blossoming relationship". On 9 October, the singer shared a 40-second preview of the song via Instagram Live. "Easy on Me" was released on 15 October 2021, to all digital music platforms. It marked the first single by Adele in nearly five years.

Lyrics 

"Easy on Me" is a piano-driven pop ballad joined by bass drum beats halfway. The song's chorus consists of its title sung in prominently elongated vocal runs. The song is written in the key of F major with a slow tempo of 70 beats per minute. The song opens with a solo piano, which leads into the vocals.

Lyrically, Adele addresses her nine-year-old son Angelo in "Easy on Me", explaining to him her divorce from his father and beseeching him to be "easy on [her]". According to Stephanee Wang writing for Nylon, Adele wrote the lyrics in reaction to her divorce proceedings stating: "In 2019, the story broke that after 11 years together, she and her ex-husband, Simon Konecki, had separated, with their divorce getting finalized in March 2021." Wang said the lyrics directly speak to Angelo, "as [Adele] tries to explain to him why she decided to split from his father and choose a new path for the two of them." Adele had also previously stated: "I just felt like I wanted to explain to [Angelo], through this record, when he’s in his twenties or thirties, who I am and why I voluntarily chose to dismantle his entire life in the pursuit of my own happiness. It made him really unhappy sometimes. And that's a real wound for me that I don't know if I'll ever be able to heal."

Critical reception

Upon release, "Easy on Me" received very positive reviews from music critics. Neil McCormick of The Daily Telegraph called the song a "bold comeback single", contrasting its simple piano arrangement with the sleek power ballad production of "Hello". He said Adele possesses a heartfelt voice, one "that digs deepest into the soul of the world." Evening Standard writer Jochan Embley lauded "Easy on Me" for its plaintive piano, elegant vocals, and "lilting" melodies. He said the song is a testament to Adele's resistance to pop music trends, avoiding "bombastic hyperpop or anodyne reggaeton" and staying true to her style. Nevertheless, Embley felt the song "doesn't quite match the mascara-streaked sorrow of 'Someone like You' (2011), or the soaring emotional heights of 'Hello'. But it is just about as powerful."

NME Nick Levine proclaimed "Adele's has never sounded better" than on "Easy on Me", making a comeback with a "slice of classic Adele balladry." Music critic Alexandra Pollard, writing for The Independent, opined that "Easy on Me" has Adele "addressing her nine-year-old son, attempting to explain to him why she chose to take apart the life he knew." Pollard admired the "raspy" vocals, sentimental lyrics, polished sound, and the piano composition evocative of "Exile" (2020) by Taylor Swift and Bon Iver. He nevertheless found the chorus of "Easy on Me" less catchy than that of "Hello". In his The Guardian review, music journalist Alexis Petridis highlighted the typical "Adele-esque" sound of the song, consisting of soulful vocals and relatable lyrics, and added that, though "Easy on Me" is not as arresting as "Someone like You", it is still better than some forgettable tracks on 25 (2015).

Fiona Sturges of i hailed it as a "heartfelt, anthemic" song that puts Adele's "remarkable instrument"—her voice—at the forefront; later in the review, Sturges expressed her concern over how the song's "slightly over-produced sheen" prevents it from being more heartaching. Pitchfork critic Cat Zhang wrote "Easy on Me" sticks to a classic formula, "for better or worse". Zhang praised Adele's vocal delivery, and deemed the song a "stirring ballad" even though it "isn't really treading new ground within [Adele's] own discography". Dubbing it a "great tune" that is not as impressive as Adele's previous lead singles, The Times Will Hodgkinson said "Easy on Me" is "nice and accomplished" but felt "a sheen of thoroughly American professionalism that stops the emotions from really hitting home in the way they did on "Someone like You"."

Accolades

Commercial performance
Upon release, "Easy on Me" broke the all-time record for the most streamed song in a single day on Spotify with 19.7 million global streams (until it was surpassed by Mariah Carey's "All I Want for Christmas is You" in 2022). It held the record for the most streamed song in a single week with 84.9 million streams. It additionally broke two Amazon Music records, the most first-day streams globally, and the most first-day Alexa requests for any song in the platform's history.

"Easy on Me" debuted at number 195 on the Billboard Global 200 from its first five hours of tracking, drawing 16,900 downloads and 7.7 million streams within the timeframe, before rocketing to the chart's top spot the following week. It tallied 136,300 downloads and 178.2 million streams in its second week, marking the third-largest sales week for any song on that chart, only behind BTS'   "Butter" and "Permission to Dance", respectively, and the second-largest streaming week on the chart, only behind "Butter", which earned 289.2 million streams. The song registered over double the chart points of the runner-up single, "Stay", by The Kid Laroi and Justin Bieber, making it the second song to do so in the chart's history, only after Olivia Rodrigo's "Drivers License", which earned triple the chart points of the runner-up song. "Easy on Me" debuted atop the Billboard Global 200 Excl. U.S. chart, tallying 62,700 downloads and 125.6 million streams, after having earned 2,000 downloads and 4.6 million streams within its first five hours. It was Adele's first chart-topper on both listings.

United States
In the United States, "Easy on Me" debuted on the Billboard Hot 100 at number 68 with only five hours of availability in the country. In that timeframe, the song garnered 3.1 million streams, 3.1 million radio audience impressions, and 14,800 digital copies sold; it marked Adele's 14th career entry on the Hot 100. The following week, it leaped to number one on the Hot 100, becoming Adele's fifth chart-topping single and her first since "Hello" in 2015. With its rise from number 68 to the top spot, "Easy on Me" marked the largest jump to number one since Taylor Swift's "Look What You Made Me Do" (2017). "Easy on Me" garnered 74,000 downloads, 53.9 million streams, and 65 million radio audience impressions in the second week. It debuted at number one on the Digital Song Sales and Streaming Songs charts, and at number four on the Radio Songs chart, breaking the record for the highest debut on the latter chart, surpassing Lady Gaga's "Born This Way" (2011), which debuted at number six. The song broke the record for the most played song in the U.S. radio history during a song's first week on the air and became the first song to be the most-added at five different formats (pop, adult contemporary, adult pop, adult album alternative and R&B) in a single week. Billboard named the song one of the biggest number one singles "of the last 30 years".

The song spent ten nonconsecutive weeks atop the Hot 100. It reached number one on the Billboard Adult Contemporary airplay chart, becoming Adele's sixth leader on the list and the quickest coronation for a non-holiday song since "Hello". In its fifth week on chart, "Easy on Me" was unseated from the top by Swift's "All Too Well (Taylor's Version)". Bolstered by the release of 30, "Easy on Me" rebounded atop the Hot 100 the following week. It became the first song to lead streaming units, sales, and radio impressions simultaneously since Luis Fonsi and Daddy Yankee's "Despacito" in 2017. With the debut of "Oh My God" at number five the same week, Adele achieved simultaneous top-five entries for a second time in her career, after "Set Fire to the Rain" and "Rolling in the Deep" in 2012. "Easy on Me" is also Adele's third song to have at least seven weeks at number one on the Adult Contemporary chart, after "Rolling in the Deep" (seven weeks) and "Hello" (10); she became the first act to top the AC chart for seven weeks with the lead singles of three consecutive albums. In its fourteenth week, "Easy on Me" became the first song to surpass 100 million in radio reach in over a year and a half, since the 115 million tally of the Weeknd's "Blinding Lights" (2019). The following week, "Easy on Me" stayed at number one for a tenth week, tying with "Hello" as Adele's longest-running number one hit on the Hot 100; she became the seventh act to have at least two number ones top the Hot 100 for 10 or more weeks, joining Boyz II Men, Drake, Mariah Carey (three number-ones each); Black Eyed Peas, Santana, and Pharrell Williams (two each).

Internationally
In the United Kingdom, "Easy on Me" broke the record for the most streamed song in a day, with over 3.2 million streams earned. The song debuted at number one on the Official Singles Chart on the week ending 28 October 2021, moving 217,300 units in its first week. It marked the highest first week sales week for a song since Ed Sheeran's "Shape of You" (2017). "Easy on Me" accumulated 24 million streams in the UK in its first week, breaking the record for the most streamed song in a single week previously held by Ariana Grande's "7 Rings" (2019), while also earning the biggest week of digital download sales of 2021, with 23,500. "Easy on Me" logged 103,000 chart sales including 11 million streams in its second week. When it topped the chart for a fifth week, it tied with 2011's "Someone Like You" as her longest-running chart-topper in the UK. The following week, with the release of 30, "Easy on Me" scored a sixth consecutive week at number one on the Official Singles Chart making it her longest-running number one single in the UK. In its twelfth week, the song returned to number one for an eighth nonconsecutive week.

"Easy on Me" debuted atop Australia's ARIA Singles Chart, becoming her third song to reach the top position. It spent a total of four weeks atop the chart. In Canada, "Easy on Me" debuted at number one on the Canadian Hot 100 and spent a total of eight weeks at number one. In Germany, "Easy on Me" went straight to number one on Offizielle Deutschen Singles Charts, scoring her fourth chart-topper within Germany. In Italy, "Easy on Me" debuted at number one on the FIMI Singles Chart, becoming her fifth chart-topper in the country. It also debuted at number one in Ireland, where it spent eight nonconsecutive weeks at the top.

Music video

The accompanying music video for "Easy on Me" was filmed on 15–16 September 2021 in Quebec, and directed by Canadian filmmaker Xavier Dolan who had previously worked with Adele on the music video for her 2015 single "Hello". Filming took place at the Chemin Jordan and the Domaine Dumont Chapelle Ste-Agnès in Sutton, a town in southwestern Quebec, including the same house used for "Hello". The music video opens in black and white and shifts to colour halfway through, as the track's beat becomes more prominent. Adele vacates the house and drives off in a furniture-filled truck, past a "Sold" sign board planted by the property. Numerous pages of sheet music fly out the car's back windows and scatter all over a road as she drives away. A video of bloopers from the production of the music video was released on 4 November 2021.

Live performances
Adele performed "Easy on Me" live during her CBS special Adele One Night Only (2021). She performed it for the first time in Europe on 20 November 2021 during a live television broadcast of the 23rd NRJ Music Awards in Cannes. Adele reprised "Easy on Me" for her ITV special An Audience with Adele (2021). She sang it during her British Summer Time concerts on 1 and 2 July 2022.

Credits and personnel

Song 
 Adele Adkins – vocals, 
 Greg Kurstin – producer, engineer, bass guitar, kick drum, piano
 Alex Pasco – recording engineer
 Julian Burg – recording engineer
 Tom Elmhirst – mixing engineer
 Matt Scatchell - mixing engineer
 Randy Merrill – mastering engineer

Video 
 Xavier Dolan – director
 Phil Lee – creative director
 André Turpin – cinematographer
 Untold Studios – production company

Charts

Weekly charts

Year-end charts

Certifications

Release history

See also
List of Billboard Adult Contemporary number ones of 2021
List of Billboard Adult Contemporary number ones of 2022
List of Billboard Global 200 number ones of 2021
List of Billboard Hot 100 number ones of 2021
List of Billboard Hot 100 number ones of 2022
List of UK Singles Chart number ones of the 2020s
List of number-one songs of 2021 (Malaysia)
List of number-one songs of 2021 (Singapore)

References

2020s ballads
2021 singles
2021 songs
Adele songs
Chris Stapleton songs
Billboard Global 200 number-one singles
Billboard Global Excl. U.S. number-one singles
Billboard Hot 100 number-one singles
Brit Award for British Single
Canadian Hot 100 number-one singles
Columbia Records singles
Dutch Top 40 number-one singles
Grammy Award for Best Pop Solo Performance
Irish Singles Chart number-one singles
Number-one singles in Australia
Number-one singles in Austria
Number-one singles in Denmark
Number-one singles in Germany
Number-one singles in Greece
Number-one singles in Israel
Number-one singles in Italy
Number-one singles in Malaysia
Number-one singles in New Zealand
Number-one singles in Norway
Number-one singles in Singapore
Number-one singles in Sweden
Number-one singles in Switzerland
Pop ballads
Song recordings produced by Greg Kurstin
Songs about nostalgia
Songs written by Adele
Songs written by Greg Kurstin
UK Singles Chart number-one singles
Ultratop 50 Singles (Flanders) number-one singles
Ultratop 50 Singles (Wallonia) number-one singles
Juno Award for Video of the Year videos